Silvio Alberti is an Italian race car driver. In 2000 he drove in Italian Formula Three for part of the season, before driving a full season in the B-Class the following year. In 2002, he would continue in the B-Class, driving part of the season for the Alberti team. He has not appeared in any major professional auto races since 2002.

References

External links

Italian racing drivers
Living people
Year of birth missing (living people)